Zvonimir Bilić (born 22 September 1971) is a former Croatian handball player and coach.

He played for the national team of Croatia.

Honours
Medveščak Zagreb
Limburgse Handbal Dagen (1): 1993
Croatian First A League Runner-up (1): 1992-93
Croatian Cup Finalist (3): 1992, 1993, 2006

Zagreb
Croatian First A League (7): 1993-94, 1994-95, 1995-96, 1996-97, 1997-98, 1998-99, 2004-2005
Croatian Cup (7): 1994, 1995, 1996, 1997, 1998, 1999, 2005
EHF Champions League Finalist (4): 1994-95, 1996-97, 1997-98, 1998-99
EHF Cup Winners' Cup Finalist (1): 2005

Conversano
Serie A (1): 2002-03
Coppa Italia (1): 2003

Individual
Greatest sportsperson of the city of Dugo Selo in the 20th Century - 2001
9th top goalscorer for Croatia national team

Orders
Order of Danica Hrvatska with face of Franjo Bučar - 1995

References

External links
European competition 

1971 births
Living people
Sportspeople from Livno
Croats of Bosnia and Herzegovina
Handball players from Zagreb
Croatian male handball players
Croatian handball coaches
RK Medveščak Zagreb players
RK Zagreb players
Mediterranean Games gold medalists for Croatia
Croatian expatriate sportspeople in Italy
Croatian expatriate sportspeople in Germany
Croatian expatriate sportspeople in Spain
Mediterranean Games medalists in handball
Competitors at the 2001 Mediterranean Games